The R918 road is a regional road in Ireland which connects J6 (Bray Central) of the N11 to the R761 at Little Bray. The majority of the known as the Dargle Road and the Upper Dargle Road.

Route
The route begins at J6 of the N11 and heads west towards Little Bray through Bray's western suburbs. The route passes the Fassaore housing estate and then terminates at its junction with the R761 at Little Bray.

See also

References
Roads Act 1993 (Classification of Regional Roads) Order 2006 – Department of Transport

Regional roads in the Republic of Ireland
Roads in County Wicklow